Rema Lapouse Award is granted to an outstanding scientist in the area of psychiatric epidemiology in recognition of "significant contributions to the scientific understanding of the epidemiology and control of mental disorders.  It is sponsored by the Mental Health, Epidemiology, and Applied Public Health Statistics Sections of the American Public Health Association. It was established in 1972 by the American physician Milton Terris in honor of his wife, Dr. Rema Lapouse, who was a founding member of the Mental Health Section.

Recipients

Other recipients
 No other known recipients.

See also

 List of medicine awards

References

Medicine awards
American awards
Awards established in 1972